Porter is an unincorporated community and census-designated place (CDP) in Grays Harbor County, Washington, United States. The population was 207 at the 2010 census. Prior to 2010 it was part of the Malone-Porter CDP; Malone and Porter are now separate CDPs. They are located just off U.S. Route 12, southeast of Elma and northwest of Oakville, and along a shortline that is part of the Puget Sound and Pacific Railroad.

History
Porter was named after Fairchild Porter, who settled in the area around 1860.

Much of Porter was destroyed by fire on January 31, 1924. Porter Saloon was re-built later that same year. When it re-opened in 1933 following the repeal of Prohibition, it was one of the first establishments to receive a liquor license in the state of Washington.

Geography
Porter is located in southeastern Grays Harbor County, east of the Chehalis River valley near the mouth of Porter Creek. The CDP extends northeast up the Porter Creek valley and east to the first ridgecrest of the local Black Hills. It is bordered to the northwest by the Malone CDP and to the west by U.S. Route 12, which leads west  to Aberdeen and southeast  to Grand Mound and Interstate 5.

References

Census-designated places in Grays Harbor County, Washington
Census-designated places in Washington (state)